World number 1 or world no. 1 refers to the highest world ranking in several competitive sports:

List of FIDE chess world number ones, in chess
List of PSA women's number 1 ranked players, women's squash
List of world number one male golfers, in men's golf
List of World Number One female golfers, in women's golf
List of world number one snooker players, in snooker
World number 1 ranked tennis players, in tennis